Ectoedemia andalusiae is a moth of the family Nepticulidae. It is found on the Iberian Peninsula, as well as in France.

The wingspan is 5.4-6.9 mm. Adults have been collected in June, July and September.

The larvae feed on Quercus coccifera. They mine the leaves of their host plant. The mine consists of a narrow corridor, filled with frass, that widens into a large, oval, upper-surface blotch with frass concentrated in its basal part and along the sides.

External links
Fauna Europaea
bladmineerders.nl
A Taxonomic Revision Of The Western Palaearctic Species Of The Subgenera Zimmermannia Hering And Ectoedemia Busck s.str. (Lepidoptera, Nepticulidae), With Notes On Their Phylogeny

Nepticulidae
Moths of Europe
Moths described in 1985